The 2002–03 First League of Serbia and Montenegro (in fall season First League of FR Yugoslavia) was the eleventh and last season as FR Yugoslavia and (after was the country renamed in February 2003) first season of the Serbia and Montenegro's top-level football league since its establishment. It was contested by 18 teams, and Partizan won the championship.

Teams 
Mladost Lučani, Zvezdara, Mladost Apatin and Radnički Kragujevac, were relegated to the Second League of Serbia and Montenegro.

The relegated teams were replaced by 2001–02 Second League of FR Yugoslavia champions, Radnički Obrenovac (North), Radnički Niš (East), Javor Ivanjica (West) and Mogren (South).

League table

Results

Winning squad
Champions: Partizan Belgrade (Coach:  Ljubiša Tumbaković (until December) and  Lothar Matthäus)

Players (appearances/goals)
  Radovan Radaković
  Milivoje Ćirković
  Dragoljub Jeremić
  Igor Duljaj
  Dejan Ognjanović
  Nenad Kutlačić
  Milan Stojanoski
  Goran Trobok
  Andrija Delibašić
  Zvonimir Vukić
  Damir Čakar
  Miladin Bečanović
  Radiša Ilić
  Nenad Mišković
  Ivan Stanković
  Taribo West
  Ivica Iliev
  Vladimir Ivić
  Ajazdin Nuhi
  Dejan Živković
  Saša Ilić
  Dejan Rusmir
  Branko Savić
  Branimir Bajić
  Danko Lazović
  Albert Nađ
  Đorđe Pantić

Top goalscorers

References

External links 
 Table and results at RSSSF

First League of Serbia and Montenegro
1
1
Serbia
2003 in Serbia and Montenegro
2002 in Yugoslav sport